"That's When I Love You" is a song co-written and recorded by American country music artist Phil Vassar.  It was released in October 2001 as the fifth and final single from his debut album Phil Vassar.  It peaked at number 3 on the Hot Country Songs chart, and number 37 on the Billboard Hot 100 chart. Vassar co-wrote this song along with his former wife Julie Wood. They both also wrote one of his other singles "The Woman in My Life", which was a top 20 hit in 2006.

The song features a backing vocal from Jo Dee Messina.

Chart positions
"That's When I Love You" debuted at number 51 on the U.S. Billboard Hot Country Singles & Tracks for the week of November 3, 2001.

Year-end charts

References

2002 singles
2000 songs
Phil Vassar songs
Songs written by Phil Vassar
Arista Nashville singles
Song recordings produced by Byron Gallimore